Hanne Boel (born 31 August 1957 in Bagsværd, Copenhagen) is a Danish singer.

Boel covers in her songs a range of styles including pop, soul, gospel, rock, and jazz. Over the course of her career, she has sold over 2.5 million records, and has had great success on the Scandinavian charts, although her work is less well known throughout the rest of the world.

Life 
Boel graduated from the Royal Danish Academy of Music in 1980, and then spent a year at the Berklee College of Music in Boston, Massachusetts. In the five years following her return to Denmark, she divided her time between singing with the Danish funk band Blast, performing as a choir soloist, and teaching music at a variety of schools and clinics.

In 1987, Boel recorded a jazz album, Shadow of Love, with Jørgen Emborg, Mads Vinding, and Alex Riel. The following year Boel released her own album, Black Wolf, which featured performances in the R&B/soul vein. The album was a great success, winning her the Danish Music Award for Danish Female Singer of the Year. Her 1990 follow-up album, Dark Passion, won four 1991 Danish Music Awards: Album of the Year, Singer of the Year, Hit of the Year ("I Wanna Make Love to You"), and Producer of the Year (Poul Bruun).

Over the subsequent two decades, Boel has released 15 additional albums, and continues to enjoy success in Scandinavia. Her two most recent albums mark a return to a more jazz-influenced genre.

Discography

Blast albums 
 1983: Blast
 1986: Blast 2
 2005: Replay

Solo albums 
 1987: Shadow Of Love (Boel/Emborg/Winding/Riel)
 1988: Black Wolf
 1990: Dark Passion
 1992: My Kindred Spirit
 1992: Kinda Soul
 1994: Misty Paradise
 1995: Best Of Hanne Boel
 1996: Silent Violence
 1998: Need
 1999: Strangely Disturbed
 2000: Boel & Hall (with Martin Hall)

Other work 
 1989: Bakerman by Laid Back

References

External links 

1957 births
20th-century Danish women singers
English-language singers from Denmark
Living people
Musicians from Copenhagen
Grappa Music artists
People from Gladsaxe Municipality
21st-century Danish women singers